Ch'usiq Uta (Aymara ch'usiqa owl, uta house, "owl house", also spelled Ch'usek Uta), also known as Cueva de San Pedro or Gruta de San Pedro (Spanish for "cave of Saint Peter" or "grotto of Saint Peter"), is a cave with an enclosed lake in the La Paz Department in Bolivia. Ch'usiq Uta is considered the largest and most famous cave of the department. It is a refuge for Geoffroy's tailless bat.

References 

Landforms of La Paz Department (Bolivia)
Caves of Bolivia